Pierre Moulin du Coudray de La Blanchère (1821–1880), sometimes known as Henri de La Blanchère, was a French ichthyologist, naturalist and photographer.

External links
 
 

1821 births
1880 deaths
19th-century French photographers
French ichthyologists
French naturalists
People from La Flèche
Pioneers of photography